Events from the year 1578 in the Kingdom of Scotland.

Incumbents
Monarch –  James VI

Events
 Battle of the Spoiling Dyke at Trumpan on the Isle of Skye: the Clan MacLeod are victorious over the MacDonalds of Uist in a feud.

Births
Robert Boyd, Principal of the University of Glasgow (died 1627)
William Welwod, jurist (died 1622)
Gilbert Jack, philosopher (died 1628)

Deaths
 14 April – James Hepburn, 4th Earl of Bothwell, third husband of Mary, Queen of Scots, in Denmark (born )
May/September – Robert Richardson, lord treasurer
September/October – Alexander Hepburn, Bishop of Ross
James Douglas, 7th of Drumlanrig, baron

See also
 Timeline of Scottish history

References